As of May 1964, Panair do Brasil served 68 Brazilian destinations (in 70 Airports), and 24 International destinations. Some cities previously served are in italics.

Africa
Senegal
Dakar - Léopold Sédar Senghor International Airport
Liberia
Monrovia - Roberts International Airport
Cape Verde
Sal - Amílcar Cabral International Airport
Egypt
Cairo - Cairo International Airport

Asia
Lebanon
Beirut - Rafic Hariri International Airport
Turkey
Istanbul - Atatürk International Airport

Europe
France
Paris - Orly Airport
Germany
Düsseldorf - Düsseldorf Airport
Frankfurt am Main - Frankfurt Airport
Hamburg - Hamburg Airport
Munich - Munich-Riem Airport
Italy
Milan - Malpensa Airport
Rome - Leonardo da Vinci-Fiumicino Airport
Portugal
Lisbon - Portela Airport
Spain
Madrid - Barajas Airport
Switzerland
Zürich - Kloten Airport
United Kingdom
London - Heathrow Airport

South America
Argentina
Buenos Aires - Ministro Pistarini International Airport (formerly Ezeiza)
Brazil
Aracaju - Santa Maria Airport
Belém - Val de Cães International Airport
Belo Horizonte - Pampulha/Carlos Drummond de Andrade Airport
Brasília - Pres. Juscelino Kubitschek International Airport
Campo Grande - Campo Grande International Airport
Corumbá - Corumbá International Airport
Cuiabá - Marechal Rondon International Airport
Curitiba - Afonso Pena International Airport
Florianópolis - Hercílio Luz International Airport
Fortaleza - Pinto Martins International Airport
Governador Valadares - Governador Valadares Airport
Guajará-Mirim - Guajará-Mirim Airport (GJM/SBGM)
João Pessoa - Pres. Castro Pinto International Airport
Maceió - Zumbi dos Palmares International Airport
Manaus - Ponta Pelada Airport
Montes Claros - Montes Claros Airport
Natal - Augusto Severo International Airport
Porto Alegre - Salgado Filho International Airport
Porto Velho - Caiari Airport (closed)
Recife - Guararapes/Gilberto Freyre International Airport
Rio Branco - Pres. Médici International Airport (closed)
Rio de Janeiro
Galeão/Antônio Carlos Jobim International Airport International and Domestic Hub
Santos Dumont Airport Domestic Hub
Salvador - Dep. Luís Eduardo Magalhães International Airport (formerly 2 de Julho)
Santarém - Maestro Wilson Fonseca Airport
São Luís - Marechal Cunha Machado International Airport (formerly Tirirical)
São Paulo
Campinas/Viracopos International Airport
Congonhas Airport
Uberaba - Uberaba Airport
Vitória - Eurico de Aguiar Salles Airport (formerly Goiabeiras)
Chile
Santiago - Los Cerrillos Airport
Paraguay
Asunción - Silvio Pettirossi International Airport (formerly Pres. Stroessner)
Peru
Lima - Jorge Chávez International Airport
Uruguay
Montevideo - Carrasco International Airport

The following cities in the Amazon region were served by amphibian aircraft Consolidated PBY Catalina, with landings and take-offs made on nearby rivers:
Brazil
Altamira
Anori
Barcelos
Benjamin Constant
Boca do Acre
Borba
Camará
Canutama
Carauari
Carvoeiro
Coari
Codajaz
Cruzeiro do Sul
Cucuí
Curralinho
Eirunepé
Fonte Boa
Foz do Aripuanã
Gurupá
Humaitá
Içana
Itacoatiara
Lábrea
Manacapuru
Manicoré
Maués
Mercês
Monte Alegre
Óbidos
Oriximiná
Pari-Cachoeira
Parintins
Portel
Porto Afonsos
Santa Isabel do Rio Negro
Santo Antônio do Içá
São Paulo de Olivença
Tapaiuna
Tarauacuá
Tefé
Vila Batista
Colombia
Leticia
Peru
Iquitos

References

External links
 Timetable images of Panair do Brasil

Lists of airline destinations